Peter Käsbauer (born 17 March 1988) is a German badminton player, specializing in doubles play. In 2007, he won a silver medal in the mixed doubles and a bronze medal in the boys' doubles at the European Junior Championships.

Achievements

European Junior Championships 
Boys' doubles

Mixed doubles

BWF World Tour (1 runner-up) 
The BWF World Tour, which was announced on 19 March 2017 and implemented in 2018, is a series of elite badminton tournaments sanctioned by the Badminton World Federation (BWF). The BWF World Tour is divided into levels of World Tour Finals, Super 1000, Super 750, Super 500, Super 300, and the BWF Tour Super 100.

Mixed doubles

BWF Grand Prix (1 title, 1 runner-up) 
The BWF Grand Prix had two levels, the Grand Prix and Grand Prix Gold. It was a series of badminton tournaments sanctioned by the Badminton World Federation (BWF) and played between 2007 and 2017.

Men's doubles

Mixed doubles

  BWF Grand Prix Gold tournament
  BWF Grand Prix tournament

BWF International Challenge/Series (18 titles, 12 runners-up) 
Men's doubles

Mixed doubles

  BWF International Challenge tournament
  BWF International Series tournament
  BWF Future Series tournament

References

External links 
 

1988 births
Living people
People from Weiden in der Oberpfalz
Sportspeople from the Upper Palatinate
German male badminton players